Jon P. Wilcox (born September 5, 1936) is an American lawyer and retired judge.  He was a justice of the Wisconsin Supreme Court for 15 years, appointed by Governor Tommy G. Thompson in 1992 and leaving office in 2007.  Prior to his time on the Supreme Court, he served for 13 years as a Wisconsin Circuit Court Judge, including seven years as Chief Judge of the 6th Judicial Administrative District of Wisconsin Circuit Courts.  Earlier, he represented Green Lake and Waushara counties in the Wisconsin State Assembly as a Republican.

Early life and education

Wilcox was born in Berlin, Wisconsin, and grew up in nearby Wild Rose. He was valedictorian of his graduating class at Wild Rose High School in 1954, then attended Ripon College.  After obtaining his bachelor's degree in 1958, he joined the United States Army and was commissioned as an officer in a military police company.  In 1961, Wilcox left the Army and entered law school at the University of Wisconsin, ultimately obtaining his law degree in 1965.

Wilcox began in private law practice at the La Crosse, Wisconsin, firm of Steele, Smyth, Klos & Flynn.  Wilcox would later refer to Jerry Klos as his mentor.  After a few years in La Crosse, Wilcox and his wife purchased 2500 acres of farmland near Wautoma and relocated there.  In 1968, he formed his own law partnership, Wilcox, Rudolph, Kubasta & Rathjen.

Wisconsin State Assembly 

Also in 1968, Wilcox was approached to run for the Green Lake and Waushara seat in the Wisconsin State Assembly.  He recognized politics as a good way to advance his law career, and decided to enter the race. He soundly defeated Republican primary opponents Scott P. Anger and Clifford D. Bvocik, then went on to win the general election without opposition.

In the Assembly, Wilcox would serve on the committees for elections, taxation, the judiciary, and insurance and banking, and served on a joint advisory committee on automobile accident liability.  He served on the Governor's commissions on reapportionment and highway safety, and served on a special legislative committee on criminal penalties.

He ultimately served three terms in the Assembly, having been re-elected in 1970 and 1972.  He did not seek re-election in 1974, facing pressure from his law partners to devote more time to the firm.

Though he left the legislature, Wilcox remained involved in politics.  He served as Chairman of the Waushara County Republican Party from 1975 through 1979, and was the state co-chair of Ronald Reagan's 1976 presidential campaign.  He was also an elected member of the Wisconsin Conservation Congress from 1975 to 1980.

Wisconsin Circuit Court 

Wilcox ultimately returned to public office in 1979 at the behest of Governor Martin J. Schreiber.  Schreiber had appointed James Poole to the Waushara Circuit Court judgeship in 1978 after the death of Judge Boyd A. Clark, but Poole died unexpectedly on the day he filed to run for a full term in 1979.  An aide to Schreiber asked Wilcox to consider running for the seat.  Wilcox eventually decided to pursue election as a write-in candidate and was victorious in the April 1979 election.   He would go on to be re-elected without opposition in 1985 and 1991.

Due to its small population, Wilcox was the only judge for Waushara County.  He saw every state case in the county, for situations ranging from criminal prosecution to property or liability disputes.  He served as chairman of the Wisconsin Sentencing Commission from 1987 to 1992. During his later years on the court, he also served as a faculty member of the Wisconsin Judicial College.

Chief Judge

In 1985, the Wisconsin Supreme Court appointed Wilcox Chief Judge of the 6th Administrative District of Wisconsin Circuit Courts, comprising, at the time, the counties of Adams, Clark, Columbia, Dodge, Green Lake, Juneau, Marquette, Portage, Sauk, Waushara, and Wood. As chief judge, he was empowered to assign judges, oversee the caseflow, and supervise the personnel and budget of the courts within his administrative district.

Wilcox served three two-year terms as chief judge, which at the time was the statutory maximum for consecutive terms.  He was elected chairman of the Wisconsin Chief Judges Committee in 1990.

Wisconsin Supreme Court 

In May, 1992, Wisconsin Supreme Court Justice William G. Callow announced that he would resign, effective September 1. Wisconsin Governor Tommy Thompson selected Wilcox to fill the vacancy, and he was sworn in on October 7, 1992. The appointment would allow Wilcox to fill out the remainder of Callow's ten-year term, expiring in 1997.

Wilcox decided to stand for election to a full ten-year term in 1997, and faced ACLU attorney Walter Kelly.  Wilcox won the election by a large margin, but his victory spawned allegations of campaign finance violations which would develop into a John Doe investigation.

1997 election campaign controversy

Wilcox was involved in a controversy in 2001 when his 1997 re-election campaign was accused of an illegally coordinated get-out-the-vote effort with the group Wisconsin Coalition for Voter Participation.  The group, which supported school choice, apparently put more than $200,000 into last-minute mailings and phone calls supporting Wilcox's candidacy.  The Wisconsin State Elections Board alleged that Wilcox's campaign violated state election law, which bans any cooperation between independent groups and a candidate or a candidate's campaign organization.

The formal complaint alleged 10 violations of state election law, including accepting prohibited corporate contributions, filing false campaign reports, and failing to file reports of late contributions.  Kelly, his opponent in the election, called on Wilcox to consider resignation.

The Board eventually reached a settlement with Wilcox's campaign, whereby a total of $60,000 in fines would be paid by members of the Wilcox campaign. At the time, this was the largest fine ever levied by the Wisconsin Elections Board. Although he denied knowing about the illegal coordination, Wilcox agreed to pay his $10,000 fine, and acknowledged that he bore the ultimate responsibility for the actions of his campaign staff.  Wilcox's campaign manager, Mark Block, also paid a $15,000 fine and promised not to work as a consultant or volunteer on any campaign until 2004. The coalition's co-founder, former Assembly Republican staffer Brent Pickens, paid a $35,000 fine and promised not to work on any campaigns for the next five years.

Wilcox did not seek re-election in 2007. His term expired on July 31, 2007, and he was succeeded by Washington County Circuit Court Judge Annette K. Ziegler, who had defeated Madison attorney Linda Clifford in the April 2007 statewide election.

Later years

After leaving the Supreme Court, Wilcox would continue to serve as a reserve judge, and would occasionally hear cases.  He remained active in politics, endorsing a 2015 referendum to change the rules governing selection of the Wisconsin Supreme Court's Chief Justice, and was outspoken about the controversy roiling the Court subsequent to the amendment's passage.  He endorsed Michael  in the 2018 Supreme Court election, and Brian Hagedorn in 2019.

Family and personal life

Wilcox married Jane Ann Heller, and together they had two children, Jeffrey Jon Wilcox and Jennifer Weekly.  Jeffrey died in 2017 at age 53. Their daughter Jennifer has two children from her first marriage to Shawn Koerner.

Wilcox and his wife own a 2500-acre tree farm near Wautoma, Wisconsin.  He enjoys hunting, fishing, and hiking.

Electoral history

Wisconsin Assembly (1968, 1970, 1972)

| colspan="6" style="text-align:center;background-color: #e9e9e9;"| Primary Election

| colspan="6" style="text-align:center;background-color: #e9e9e9;"| General Election

| colspan="6" style="text-align:center;background-color: #e9e9e9;"| General Election

| colspan="6" style="text-align:center;background-color: #e9e9e9;"| General Election

Wisconsin Circuit Court (1979, 1985, 1991)

Wisconsin Supreme Court (1997)

Notes

External links
Wisconsin Supreme Court bio

|-

1936 births
Living people
People from Berlin, Wisconsin
Military personnel from Wisconsin
Members of the Wisconsin State Assembly
Justices of the Wisconsin Supreme Court
Wisconsin state court judges
Ripon College (Wisconsin) alumni
University of Wisconsin Law School alumni
People from Wild Rose, Wisconsin